Wojnowo  is a village in the administrative district of Gmina Kargowa, within Zielona Góra County, Lubusz Voivodeship, in western Poland.

Notable residents
 Prince Bernhard of Lippe-Biesterfeld (1911-2004)

References

Wojnowo